DAT LT, formerly named DOT LT, is an airline from Lithuania, that offers worldwide ACMI services using a small fleet of passenger aircraft. It is a subsidiary of Danish DAT.

History 
The airline was established and started operations in 2003 as Danu Oro Transportas with assistance from its majority shareholder DAT Danish Air Transport. On 13 April 2006, it was rebranded as DOT LT, and in 2019 as DAT LT. The company has 60 employees (at February 2010) and is a member of the European Regions Airline Association.

Destinations
DAT LT no longer operate scheduled services.
The fleet is leased out and operate non-scheduled flights according to the respective contracts.

Fleet

Current fleet
As of November 2022, the DAT LT fleet consists of the following aircraft:

Former fleet
The airline previously operated the following aircraft (as of August 2017):
 8 ATR42-300
 3 ATR72-200
 2 Saab 340A

Incidents
 On 8 August 2010, a DOT LT ATR 42-300 (registered LY-DOT) that was parked at Pori Airport in Finland was hit by a small tornado and lifted into the air. The aircraft was damaged beyond economical repair when it slammed back onto the ground.

References

External links

Airlines of Lithuania
European Regions Airline Association
Airlines established in 2003
Aviation in Kaunas
Lithuanian companies established in 2003